Nick Erik Auf der Maur (April 10, 1942 – April 7, 1998) was a Canadian journalist, politician and "man about town" boulevardier in Montreal, Quebec. He was also the father of rock musician Melissa Auf der Maur, through his marriage to Linda Gaboriau.

Early life 
The youngest of four children of Swiss German immigrants J. Severin and Theresa Auf der Maur, his birth name was Nikolaus.  He was a regular at various downtown Montreal bars, and often transacted official and unofficial business there, entertaining visitors to the city, telling stories, and meeting with a wide range of Montrealers from all walks of life.

Journalist
As a journalist he was on the staff as a regular columnist for the Montreal Gazette. When the Montreal Star ceased operation in 1977, most of the staff of the Gazette moved into the Star building on Saint-Jacques Street. A frequent subject was his daughter Melissa Auf der Maur, about whom he often wrote in his newspaper columns as she was growing up. She once observed that she had been known her whole life as Nick Auf der Maur's daughter, until she became the bassist for Hole, whereupon he became known as Melissa Auf der Maur's father.

He was also a television personality, serving as co-host of the Canadian Broadcasting Corporation's Quelque-Show with Les Nirenberg during the early 1970s.

Mordecai Richler claimed that Auf der Maur once went bar-hopping with Conrad Black and when they accidentally wandered into a gay bar and were asked to leave, Black indignantly insisted it was his democratic right to stay, so they did.

Politician
As a young man, he participated in left-wing politics. While working as a story editor at the Canadian Broadcasting Corporation, Auf der Maur and his producer were arrested under the War Measures Act during the October Crisis. His cell was across from that of future Parti Québécois cabinet minister Gérald Godin. He was not charged with an offence.

As a politician, he was a long-time city councillor in Montreal. He was also a candidate at various times in provincial and federal elections in Quebec, never successfully, with frequent changes of political affiliation. He accurately predicted the massive cost overruns and deficits of the 1976 Summer Olympics held in Montreal, and was a sharp critic of longtime mayor Jean Drapeau. In 1987 Auf der Maur controversially supported the Overdale development which saw nearly 100 of his constituents evicted from their homes, which were then demolished in 1989.

In 1974, he was elected as a city councillor for Montreal for the Rassemblement des citoyens de Montréal (Montreal Citizens' Movement). His campaign manager in his first election campaign was Stuart McLean. In 1976, he formed the Alliance démocratique (Democratic Alliance) party and ran as a candidate in the 1976 provincial election; the party won no seats and soon disbanded.  In 1978 and 1982, he was again elected city councillor under the Municipal Action Group banner, and in 1986 was re-elected as an independent candidate. In the 1984 federal election, he ran as a Progressive Conservative candidate in Notre-Dame-de-Grâce, and although the Conservatives won that election in a landslide including many Quebec seats, Auf der Maur failed to win a seat.

He remained a city councillor, and in 1988, he even briefly joined the Civic Party of retired former mayor Jean Drapeau, which he once bitterly opposed. He left that party a year later, eventually joining the Montreal Municipal Party, an evolution of the Municipal Action Group. However, upon merger of the Montreal Municipal Party and the old Civic Party in 1992, he became part of the new Civic Party, but left a year later. In 1994, he ran as an independent and was defeated in what would prove to be his final election. Columnist Allan Fotheringham wrote that half the voters in Montreal thought Auf der Maur was a joke and the other half thought he was a legend. It was also said of Auf Der Maur: "half his (downtown) constituents share his lifestyle -- and the other half wish they did."

Death and legacy
Known for his smoking and drinking, he was diagnosed with throat cancer in December 1996 and died in 1998. His funeral at St. Patrick's Basilica was attended by nearly 3,000 people. He was interred in the Cimetière Notre-Dame-des-Neiges in Montreal, Quebec.

He was strongly opposed to the practice of renaming streets after illustrious individuals; therefore, after his death when it was desired to honour him with a street name, it was necessary to find a street with no name. A small alley off of Rue Crescent, whose bars he was famous for frequenting, was therefore renamed Ruelle Nick-Auf der Maur.

Books
He wrote the book The Billion-Dollar Game: Jean Drapeau and the 1976 Olympics. He was a co-author, along with Robert Chodos and Rae Murphy, of the 1984 book Brian Mulroney: The Boy from Baie Comeau, which traced the new Canadian prime minister Brian Mulroney's life from boyhood to national leadership. He edited Quebec: A Chronicle 1968-1972 along with Robert Chodos, which is a collection of articles from the Last Post, a short lived left leaning English publication in Quebec during the 1970s.

He is the subject of the book Nick: A Montreal Life. It is a collection of his columns published posthumously by the Montreal Gazette. The introduction was written by his long-time friend Mordecai Richler, and contains over 20 caricatures of Auf der Maur drawn by political cartoonist Aislin.

References

1942 births
1998 deaths
Anglophone Quebec people
Nick
Canadian non-fiction writers
Canadian people of Swiss-German descent
Canadian political party founders
Canadian social commentators
Deaths from cancer in Quebec
Deaths from esophageal cancer
Montreal city councillors
Montreal Gazette people
October Crisis
Writers from Montreal
Candidates in Quebec provincial elections
Quebec candidates for Member of Parliament
Progressive Conservative Party of Canada candidates for the Canadian House of Commons
Candidates in the 1984 Canadian federal election
Burials at Notre Dame des Neiges Cemetery
20th-century non-fiction writers